Chris Foreman is a Chicago-based organist and pianist. He has been recorded with the Deep Blue Organ Trio and the Kimberly Gordon Trio and appears in a BT Productions video titled "Funk on the B-3". Foreman appears regularly at the Green Mill.  In January 2015 he released his own compact disc entitled "Now is the Time".

Discography

As leader
 Now is the Time, (The Sirens, 2015)

With Deep Blue Organ Trio
 Deep Blue Bruise (Delmark, 2004)
 Goin' to Town: Live at the Green Mill (Delmark, 2006)
 Folk Music (Origin, 2007)
 Wonderful! (Origin, 2011)

With Kimberly Gordon
 Melancholy Serenade (The Sirens, 2004)
 Sunday (The Sirens, 2011)

With Red Holloway
 Go Red Go! (Delmark, 2008)

With Soul Message Band
 Soulful Days (Delmark, 2019)

Sources
 
 
 
 

Living people
American jazz organists
American male organists
Blind musicians
21st-century organists
21st-century American male musicians
American male jazz musicians
Year of birth missing (living people)
21st-century American keyboardists